Beit Chama - Aaqidiyeh is a  local authority  in the Baalbek District of the Baalbek-Hermel Governorate in Lebanon.

History
In 1838, Eli Smith noted Beit Shama's population as being predominantly  Metawileh.

References

Bibliography

External links
Beit Chama - Aaqidiyeh, localiban

Populated places in Baalbek District
Shia Muslim communities in Lebanon